Redfearn v Serco Ltd [2006] EWCA Civ 659 and Redfearn v United Kingdom [2012] ECHR 1878 is a UK labour law and European Court of Human Rights case. It held that UK law was deficient in not allowing a potential claim based on discrimination for one's political belief. Before the case was decided, the Equality Act 2010 provided a remedy to protect political beliefs, though it had not come into effect when this case was brought forth.

Facts
Arthur Redfearn was a bus driver for Serco, trading as West Yorkshire Transport Service, for Bradford City Council. He was disabled and drove a bus for disabled people. He had been rated as a first class employee by his Asian supervisor. But then he was elected as councillor for Bradford, representing the far right British National Party. The union had words with Redfearn, who said that on "health and safety" grounds he would be made redundant. The alleged idea was that in an area with large ethnic minority populations, his profile would make him a target for violent attacks, and that could make for an unsafe bus service.

Redfearn alleged that he was being directly racially discriminated against under s 1(1)(a) of the Race Relations Act 1976, 'on racial grounds'. In previous cases, it had been held that this phrase should be construed widely. He said that where a person was subject to a detriment (here a dismissal) for a reason which involved race, that amounted to discrimination contrary to the Act

Redfearn lost at the Employment Tribunal, but succeeded at the Employment Appeal Tribunal, and Serco appealed to the Court of Appeal.

Judgment

Court of Appeal
Mummery LJ held that the purpose of the race discrimination rules was to combat the state of mind that breeds intolerance, not protect it. The indirect discrimination claim was held to fail on the technical point of pleading. He pointed out the Tribunal had suggested a 'provision, criterion or practice' that would be complained of was banning anyone with BNP membership. But that was wrong, because there could be no non-white comparator, because only whites were allowed in. Mummery LJ said,

Therefore, it was unnecessary to consider a 'health and safety' justification, but if it had been considered, as the Tribunal did, then more scrutiny was probably needed.

Furthermore, there was no human rights claim for Redfearn. David Pannick QC, acting for Serco Ltd submitted correctly that Art 17 of the European Convention on Human Rights states that nothing in the Convention should allow rights for any group to engage in activity aimed at destroying Convention rights.

Dyson LJ and Sir Martin Nourse agreed.

Mr Redfearn applied to the European Court of Human Rights, alleging the decision violated his right to freedom of association, private life, and that he had been unequally treated.

European Court of Human Rights
The European Court of Human Rights held that Mr Redfearn's right to freedom of association has been infringed and violated, because the qualifying period of one year for unfair dismissal left no room for a claim that he was discriminated against on grounds of his political beliefs.

Three judges dissented.

Significance
The effect of the Court of Appeal decision appeared to be that any employer may pursue a workplace equality policy that results in refusal to hire staff who belong to political or religious groups whose aim is to undermine the fundamental rights set forth in the ECHR. However, the European Court of Human Rights decision casts doubt on any ability to simply dismiss a person because of their political beliefs. In particular, the use of a qualifying period for the ERA 1996 right to dismiss a person was held to be inadequate. A proposal to remedy this was put forward by the Government in the Enterprise and Regulatory Reform Bill. This provision is now contained as an automatically unfair reason for dismissal in the ERA 1996, and does not require compliance with a qualifying period to be asserted. On the contrary, the affected worker may bring a claim since the first day of employment if there was a dismissal on these grounds.

See also
Employment discrimination law in the UK
Eweida v United Kingdom [2009] IRLR 78 (EAT) (costs capping order refused in [2009] EWCA Civ 1025)

Notes

References
E McGaughey, A Casebook on Labour Law (Hart 2019) ch 12, 547

External links
BBC News article on Redfearn's case

United Kingdom labour case law
Court of Appeal (England and Wales) cases
2006 in case law
2012 in case law
2006 in British law
History of the British National Party
Anti-discrimination law in the United Kingdom
Article 11 of the European Convention on Human Rights
European Court of Human Rights cases involving the United Kingdom